Ashley Hutton (born 2 November 1987) is a Northern Irish footballer who plays as a defender for Linfield and has appeared for the Northern Ireland women's national team.

Career
Hutton has been capped for the Northern Ireland national team, appearing for the team during the 2019 FIFA Women's World Cup qualifying cycle.

On 3 September 2019, Hutton played her 100th match for Northern Ireland against Wales.

References

External links
 
 
 

1987 births
Living people
Women's association footballers from Northern Ireland
Northern Ireland women's international footballers
Women's association football defenders
FIFA Century Club
Linfield Ladies F.C. players
Women's Premiership (Northern Ireland) players
UEFA Women's Euro 2022 players